Senator Osmond may refer to:

Aaron Osmond, Utah State Senate
George Osmond (politician) (1836–1913), Wyoming State Senate